The Wodzisław Castle is a historic castle and palace located in the Wodzisław Śląski, in south Poland. 

The old castle was built in the 13th century. The new residence Dietrichstein Palace from 1745 is the oldest example of classicism architecture in Poland.

See also
 Castles in Poland

References
M.Furmanek, S. Kulpa,”Zamek wodzisławski i jego właściciele”, Wodzisław Śl. 2003

External links

Official website 

Wodzisław Śląski
Castles in Silesian Voivodeship
Palaces in Poland